Navy Children School, Mumbai (also known as NCS Mumbai, NCS Colaba) is an educational institution located in Navy Nagar, Colaba, Mumbai. It provides primary, secondary and senior secondary education (i.e. up to 12th class) and follows the syllabus set by the Central Board of Secondary Education. The current school principal is Mrs. Mallika Subramanium.

History 
Founded in 1984, it is run by the Navy Education Society under the Indian Navy as part of the chain of Navy Children Schools which are located throughout India. The school was initially known as Naval Public School as part of the Education Society's mandate but changed to Navy Children School in 2005 following a new mandate. The school opened one of its branches near the main campus at Pasta Lane in Mumbai for classes I to III, and the rest are located in the main campus at Navy Nagar.

Academics 
The school offers three streams- Science, Commerce, and Humanities. Each stream gets 3 to 4 mandatory subjects like English, Physics and Chemistry for Science; English, Accounts, Business Studies and Economics for Commerce and English, Economics and Psychology for Humanities; and 1 or two optional subjects like Physical Education, Mathematics and Mass Media. The school follows the CBSE board.

Clubs 
The school offers various clubs and has a dedicated extra hour of class for the same on Fridays after school. Clubs are available based on the student's grades and clubs like Dance, Music, Dramatics, NCC, Literature, General Knowledge, and many more are available.

CCA 
The school engages in inter-house competitions in various fields throughout the year, and clubs them under CCA (Co-Curricular Activities).

Houses 
Named after Naval Bases in Mumbai

References

External links 
 

Private schools in Mumbai
1984 establishments in Maharashtra
Educational institutions established in 1984